Magne Alfred Michaelson (September 7, 1878 – October 26, 1949) was a U.S. Representative from Illinois.

Background
Magne Alfred Michaelson was born at Kristiansand in Vest-Agder, Norway. In October 1885, Michaelson immigrated to the United States with his parents who settled in Chicago, Illinois. He attended the public schools and graduated from Chicago Normal School in 1898. He taught in the public schools of Chicago (1898-1914). He served as chairman of the board of directors of the Madison and Kedzie State Bank of Chicago (1924-1927).

Political career
He served as a member of the Chicago City Council (1915-1918). He served as delegate to the State constitutional convention in 1920.

Michaelson was elected as a Republican candidate to the Sixty-seventh and to the four succeeding Congresses (March 4, 1921 – March 3, 1931). On August 15, 1921 he made a speech in the House in which he questioned the patriotism and integrity of the newly formed American Legion as being bought and controlled by the interests of Wall Street.

In 1929, Michaelson was charged with for a violation of the Volstead Act. His brother-in-law pleaded guilty and the judge issued a $1,000 fine. He was an unsuccessful candidate for renomination in 1930. He subsequently resumed his position in banking. He died on October 26, 1949 and was interred in Mount Olivet Cemetery in Chicago, Illinois.

Note

References

1878 births
1949 deaths
Norwegian emigrants to the United States
People from Vest-Agder
Republican Party members of the United States House of Representatives from Illinois
Politicians from Chicago
Politicians from Kristiansand